Ravnice may refer to:

 Ravnice, Bosnia and Herzegovina, a village near Bosanski Novi
 Ravnice, Primorje-Gorski Kotar County, a village near Čabar, Croatia
 Ravnice, Krapina-Zagorje County, a village near Veliko Trgovišće in Croatia
 Ravnice, Zagreb, a neighbourhood of Zagreb, Croatia
 Ravnice Desinićke, a village near Desinić, Croatia